Praxis may refer to:

Philosophy and religion 
Praxis (process), the process by which a theory, lesson, or skill is enacted, practised, embodied, or realised
Praxis model, a way of doing theology
 Praxis (Byzantine Rite), the practice of faith, especially worship
 Christian theological praxis, the practice of the Gospel in the world
 Praxis School, a Marxist humanist philosophical movement
 Praxis (British philosophy journal), a journal of philosophy published by the University of Manchester
 Praxis (Yugoslav philosophy journal), a journal of philosophy published by Praxis School
 Praxis International, the continuation of Praxis and predecessor of Constellations
 Praxis: Journal of Gender and Cultural Critiques

Organizations and business 
 Praxis (store), a Dutch chain of hardware stores
 Altran Praxis, a British software company
 Praxis Business School, Kolkata, a management institute in India
 Praxis Care, a social-care charity based in Belfast, Northern Ireland
 Praxis Ethiopia, an international organisation addressing poverty in Ethiopia

The arts 
 Praxis, a novel by Fay Weldon, published in 1978
 The Praxis, a 2002 novel by Walter Jon Williams
 Praxis (album), by Cecil Taylor recorded live in Italy in 1968
 Praxis (band), an experimental rock project led by Bill Laswell
 Praxis (dance music act)
 Praxis (art collaborative), an American art duo
 PRAXIS: a journal of writing + building, published by the Ohio State University College of Engineering

In fiction 
 Praxis, a fictional moon in the film Star Trek VI: The Undiscovered Country
 Praxis, a metanational corporation in Kim Stanley Robinson's Mars trilogy
 Praxis, a fictional underground metropolis in the SyFy series Sanctuary
 Praxis Kit, an item used to unlock various abilities in several of the Deus Ex video games
 "Praxis", an episode of the podcast Alice Isn't Dead
 Baron Praxis, an antagonist in the 2003 video game Jak II

Other uses 
 Praxis (moth), a genus of moths of the family Noctuidae
 Praxis Discussion Series, televised discussion on international development established by the World Bank in Australia
 Praxis intervention, in social work, a methodology for intervention within communities
 Praxis Rabemananjara (born 1987), Malagasy footballer
 Praxis test, a United States teacher certification exam
 PRAXXIS, (with added X) a feminist design atelier at The Manchester School of Architecture led by Helen Iball (also known as Helen Aston).

See also 
 Practice (disambiguation)
 Praxeology